"Help Me!" is a song by Marcy Levy (better known now as Marcella Detroit) and Robin Gibb. The song was recorded for the official soundtrack of Times Square, and released as the album's lead single, going on to peak at #50 on the Billboard Top 100. It was also considered as Levy's first single and her only song that was charted in the United States.

Background
After working on Jimmy Ruffin's Sunrise (including the track "Where Do I Go", a duet by Ruffin and Marcy Levy) Robin Gibb and Bee Gees keyboardist Blue Weaver work together again by supplying tracks for the soundtrack of the film Times Square (an RSO movie). And the result was the song "Help Me!" sung by Levy and Gibb. The song was heard in the film's closing credits.

Related session outtake, "Touch Me", a song also written by Gibb and Levy with lead vocals provided by Levy as a demo for Linda Clifford but was not recorded by Clifford herself. Weaver says he and Levy didn't like its sexually charged lyrics and Gibb had to talk Levy into singing it. The B-side of the single, an instrumental version of "Help Me!" on which they made two instrumental versions of the same track, one with Gary Brown playing a sax solo.

It peaked #50 in the Billboard Hot 100, #65 in Cashbox and #64 in Record World. It was released in September 1980 elsewhere except in Australia when the song was released as a single there in November that same year.

Charts

Personnel 
Adapted from the Times Square Soundtrack album booklet:
 Robin Gibb — lead and harmony vocal
 Marcy Levy — lead and harmony vocal
 Blue Weaver — keyboards, synthesizer
 Gary Brown — sax
 Uncredited — handclaps

References 

1980 debut singles
1980 songs
Robin Gibb songs
Marcella Detroit songs
Songs written by Robin Gibb
Songs written by Blue Weaver
Song recordings produced by Robin Gibb
RSO Records singles